Ready for the Real Life is the seventh album by German rock band Fools Garden, released in 2005. As it was recorded with a new line-up (except for singer Peter Freudenthaler and guitarist Volker Hinkel), the band's name was changed to Fools Garden. "Man of Devotion" was released as the first single. "Does Anybody Know?" and "Welcome Sun" were released as a double A-side.

Track listing
 "Welcome Sun"
 "Cook It A While"
 "Comedy Song"
 "Daihaminkay"
 "Cold"
 "Does Anybody Know?"
 "Jeannie Is Dancing With The Sun"
 "Man Of Devotion"
 "Rain"
 "Count On Me"
 "Life"
 "Peter's Riding His Horse"
 "Dreaming (remastered version/bonus track)"

Musicians
Peter Freudenthaler - vocals, keyboards
Volker Hinkel - guitars, keyboards, percussion, backing vocals
Dirk Blümlein - bass, rhodes, backing vocals
Gabriel Holz - guitars, sitar, backing vocals
Claus Müller - drums, backing vocals

Singles
Dreaming (2004 version)
Man Of Devotion
Does Anybody Know?/Welcome Sun (double A-side)

Trivia
The song "Dreaming", appearing here as a bonus track, originally featured on the album 25 Miles to Kissimmee, but was re-recorded in 2004 for a new single release.

2005 albums
Fools Garden albums
Bertelsmann Music Group albums